Armenia–Hungary relations refer to bilateral relations between Armenia and Hungary. Armenia is represented in Hungary through its embassy in Vienna, Austria, and an honorary consulate in Budapest, Hungary. Hungary is represented in Armenia through its embassy in Tbilisi, Georgia, and an honorary consulate in Yerevan, Armenia.

Background 
Since the end of World War II, the two countries were under communist domination as both Hungary (Hungarian People's Republic) and Armenia (Armenian Soviet Socialist Republic) was a satellite state and the constituent republic of the Soviet Union respectively.

Diplomatic relations between the two nations started at the end of the Cold War, mainly with the dissolution of the Soviet Union in 1991.

There are around 15,000 people of Armenian descent living in Hungary.

Severing of diplomatic relations
On 31 August 2012, Armenia severed relations with Hungary following the extradition of Ramil Safarov – convicted of murdering Armenian Lieutenant Gurgen Margaryan in Hungary in 2004. Also rumors spread this was carried out in exchange for a $7 million bribe. Safarov was pardoned upon returning to Azerbaijan, and was treated as a national hero: Safarov was promoted to the military rank of major, received an apartment, and was given back pay for his 8 years of imprisonment. Relatives of the murdered officer sued Hungary and Azerbaijan for violating Articles 2 (right to life) and 14 (prohibition against discrimination) of the European Convention on Human Rights. European Court of Human Rights recognized governments of Hungary and Azerbaijan as respondents in this case. 

In Yerevan, protesters threw tomatoes at the building of Hungary's honorary consulate and tore down the flag of Hungary. The United States also criticised the decision to free Safarov. In April 2013, Armenia's acting Foreign Minister Eduard Nalbandyan said that "Armenia [was] ready to settle relations with Hungary, but Budapest should undertake steps".

Restoration of diplomatic relations
On 1 December 2022, nearly 10 years after the severing of diplomatic relations, Armenia and Hungary agreed to restore diplomatic relations and appoint non-resident ambassadors. This decision came as a result of negotiations within the framework of the OSCE Ministerial Council in Łódź, Poland.

See also 
 Foreign relations of Armenia
 Foreign relations of Hungary 
 Armenians in Hungary
 Armenia–EU relations
 Azerbaijan–Hungary relations

References 

 
Hungary
Bilateral relations of Hungary